Awaz (Urdu: آواز, translation: voice), is the first album released by Pakistani pop musical group Awaz. The album was released in 1993 by EMI. Haroon and Fakhir as the lead performers, the album took the Pakistani pop scene by storm and set new standards for the emerging and youthful pop singing fraternity.

Track listing 

 Jan-e-Man
 Keh Do
 Jaanay Kaun Thi Haseena
 Diya
 Take on the World
 Oh Girl
 Awaz
 Dhund
 Nai Manzilain
 Dhoka
 Epilogue

Personnel
All information is taken from the CD.

Awaz
Haroon Rashid – lead vocals
Asad Ahmed – lead guitars
Faakhir Mehmood – vocals, keyboards, piano

Additional musicians
Rizwan-ul-Haq – rhythm guitars, bass guitars

External links
Haroon Official Website - includes biography and complete discography of Awaz
Asad Ahmed Official Website
Faakhir Official Website

1993 debut albums
Awaz albums
Urdu-language albums